The 39th South American Junior Championships in Athletics were held
in Medellín, Colombia in the Estadio Alfonso Galvis Duque from
September 23–25, 2011.    A detailed report on the results was given.

Participation (unofficial)

Detailed result lists can be found on the CBAt website, and on the "World Junior Athletics History"
website. An unofficial count yields the number of about 271
athletes from about 13 countries: Argentina (30), Bolivia (10), Brazil (75),
Chile (26), Colombia (61), Ecuador (23), Guyana (1), Panama (7), Paraguay (6),
Peru (11), Suriname (3), Uruguay (6), Venezuela (12).

Medal summary
Medal winners are published
Complete results can be found on the CBAt, and on the "World Junior Athletics History"
website.

Men

Women

Medal table

The medal count was published.

Team trophies

The placing tables for team trophy (overall team, men and women categories) were published.

Total

Male

Female

References

External links
World Junior Athletics History

South American U20 Championships in Athletics
2011 in Colombian sport
South American Junior
2011 in South American sport
International athletics competitions hosted by Colombia
2011 in youth sport